Xênkyêr or Shikyher (ཤི་འཁྱེར་, Xinjixiang 新吉乡) is a township of Baingoin County, Tibet Autonomous Region, People's Republic of China.

See also
List of towns and villages in Tibet

Populated places in Nagqu
Township-level divisions of Tibet